Lisa Neyt (Deinze) is a Belgian female volleyball player and also a teacher. She is part of the Belgium women's national volleyball team.

She participated in the 2014 FIVB Volleyball World Grand Prix, 2017 FIVB Volleyball World Grand Prix, and 2018 FIVB Volleyball Women's Nations League.
On club level she played for VDK Gent.
With this club Neyt won the national volleyball title in 2012-2013.

References

External links
 Profile at FIVB.org

1993 births
Living people
Belgian women's volleyball players
Place of birth missing (living people)
Liberos
People from Deinze
Sportspeople from East Flanders
21st-century Belgian women